Nico Löffler (born July 5, 1997) is an Austrian footballer who plays for SV Stripfing.

References

External links

1997 births
Living people
Austrian footballers
Austrian expatriate footballers
Association football midfielders
FC Admira Wacker Mödling players
VfB Lübeck players
Austrian Football Bundesliga players
Austrian Regionalliga players
Regionalliga players
Austrian expatriate sportspeople in Germany
Expatriate footballers in Germany